Amblyseius saurus is a species of mite in the family Phytoseiidae.

References

saurus
Articles created by Qbugbot
Animals described in 1962